Scully: The World Show is a Canadian talk show hosted by Robert Scully, who has interviewed some of the world's most prominent and famous personalities. Each week, Scully discusses topical issues with Nobel laureates, heads of state, royalty, authors, financiers, athletes, designers, diplomats and philanthropists.  The show, which debuted on November 5, 1988, has been taped worldwide. It is produced in Montreal, Quebec, Canada by Télémission Information Inc. and airs in syndication. The talk show was first syndicated for the 1998-'99 season and is distributed by American Public Television.

External links

 Scully: The World Show website
 Télémission Information Inc.

1988 Canadian television series debuts
1980s Canadian television talk shows
1990s Canadian television talk shows